Selhurst is an area in the London Borough of Croydon  south-south-east of Charing Cross. Historically it lay in Surrey. The area is bounded to the west and south by Thornton Heath and Croydon and to the east and south by South Norwood and Woodside. Selhurst Park, the home stadium of Crystal Palace Football Club, is sited at the northern end of the neighbourhood.

History
Selhurst is named after the Old English for "dwelling in a wood", or possibly 'dwelling where willows grow'; the name is first recorded in 1225. Saxon coins were found here when the railway station was built. Housing began to be built in the area following the opening of the Croydon Canal in 1809, however the canal proved to be a failure and it closed in 1836. Races were held at Heaver's Farm in the 1850s-60s. Further housing development occurred following the opening of Selhurst train station in 1865.

Green spaces
King George's Field (recreation ground)  is sited near the junction of Selhurst Road and Sydenham Road with entrances on Sydenham Road and Gloucester Road. Facilities include an outdoor gymnasium, children's play area and multi-use hard court.

Demography
White British is the largest ethnic group as of the 2011 census, forming 26% of the population. The second and third largest were Black Caribbean and Black African, both 14% each. 65.5% of the population are of BAME minority background, higher than the Croydon average.

The median house price in Selhurst ward in 2014 was £212,998, which is the 17th lowest out of the 628 wards of Greater London.

Education
The BRIT School, a performing arts school operated by The BRIT foundation, more commonly known for the BRIT Awards, is located in the area.

Transport
Selhurst railway station has frequent trains north to London Victoria, and London Bridge at peak times, and south to Sutton, Caterham and Epsom Downs via East Croydon and West Croydon. Selhurst Depot is mainly used by the Southern train operating company, and lies on the site of the former Crystal Palace FC grounds. Selhurst is in Zone 4 of the London Transport Network.

London Bus Route 75 and London Bus Route 157 both run the length of Selhurst Road, terminating at Croydon and Lewisham (75) and Morden and Crystal Palace (157).

Notable residents
 Samuel Coleridge-Taylor (1875–1912), composer, lived at 30 Dagnall Park.
 Juris Kalnins (Born 1990), Polish singer, musician, philanthropist and activist lives in Selhurst. He famously reduced the capacity of his shows in Russia as a protest against the 2022 Russian invasion of Ukraine.

Gallery

References

External links

Selhurst Property Guide

Districts of the London Borough of Croydon
Areas of London